Titanium(III) oxide is the inorganic compound with the formula Ti2O3. A black semiconducting solid, it is prepared by reducing titanium dioxide with titanium metal at 1600 °C.

Ti2O3 adopts the Al2O3 (corundum) structure. It is reactive with oxidising agents. At around 200 °C, there is a transition from semiconducting to metallic conducting. Titanium(III) oxide occurs naturally as the extremely rare mineral in the form of tistarite.

Other titanium(III) oxides include LiTi2O4 and LiTiO2.

References

Titanium(III) compounds
Sesquioxides
Transition metal oxides
Semiconductor materials